Martin Fillo (born 7 February 1986) is a Czech professional footballer who plays for Trinity Zlín as a right winger. He is a former Czech Republic international and has played domestic football in the Czech Republic, Norway and England.

Playing career

Viktoria Plzeň 
Fillo began his career with 2. Liga club Viktoria Plzeň and helped the club to promotion to the First League during the 2004–05 season. In his first full season in the top flight, he made 29 appearances and scored five goals, as Plzeň narrowly avoided relegation. He played 15 matches and scored five goals during the 2007–08 season, before making his last appearance for the club in December 2007.

Viking 
Fillo signed a five-year deal with Norwegian Tippeligaen club Viking in 2008, breaking the transfer record at the club. He made his debut for Viking on match day one of the 2008 season, assisting the winning goal and being voted man of the match in a 1–0 victory over Strømsgodset IF. He scored his first goal for Viking in a 1–0 victory over Tromsø IL on match day four. He appeared consistently during the 2008 season, making 28 appearances and scoring 8 goals. He made 25 appearances and scored three goals during the 2009 season and played in Viking's UEFA Cup qualifiers, which ended with a second round defeat to Honka. In the 2010 season, Fillo made only 15 appearances, but scored five goals, including a hat-trick against Odds on 4 July 2010.

Return to Viktoria Plzeň 
Fillo re-signed for Viktoria Plzeň on a -year contract during the 2010–11 season and made 12 appearances, scoring one goal. He won the first silverware of his career, having helped Plzeň to the First League title and he also won the 2011 Czech Supercup with the club. Fillo made 9 appearances and scored one goal during the first half of the 2011–12 season and spent the second half of the season on loan at fellow First League club Mladá Boleslav. He made 17 appearances and helped the club a fourth-place finish (one place behind his parent club Viktoria Plzeň) and Europa League qualification.

Fillo made 27 appearances for Viktoria Plzeň during the club's First League-winning 2012–13 season. He played part of the first half of the season on loan at Mladá Boleslav, making 10 appearances before returning to Plzeň prior to the winter break.

In July 2013, Fillo agreed a season-long loan with English League One club Brentford, linking up with Uwe Rösler, his former manager at Viking. He scored one goal in 9 appearances, before being dropped from the team in October 2013. New manager Mark Warburton indicated in late December 2013 that he would hold talks with Fillo over his future. Fillo was made available for loan on 19 February 2014, but did not win any further calls into the first team squad before the end of the season. 

Fillo joined First League club 1. FK Příbram on loan for the duration of the 2014–15 season. He made 27 appearances and scored two goals before his Viktoria Plzeň contract expired at the end of the season. Fillo made 56 appearances and scored three goals in his second spell with Plzeň.

FK Teplice 
In July 2015, Fillo signed a three-year contract with First League club FK Teplice on a free transfer. Over the course of  seasons, he made 73 appearances and scored 22 goals and departed Na Stínadlech in December 2017.

FC Baník Ostrava 

On 29 December 2017, Fillo joined Czech First League club FC Baník Ostrava on a permanent contract for an undisclosed fee. He made 115 appearances and scored five goals during  seasons with the club.

FC Trinity Zlín 
On 4 June 2021, Fillo joined Czech First League club FC Trinity Zlín (then named FC Fastav Zlín) on a two-year contract for an undisclosed fee. He ended a relegation-threatened 2021–22 season with 28 appearances and one goal.

International career 
Fillo represented the Czech Republic at youth level and was U21 captain. He won three caps for the senior team in 2009.

Career statistics

Honours 
 Viktoria Plzeň
 Czech First League (2): 2010–11, 2012–13
 Czech 2. Liga third-place promotion (1): 2004–05
 Czech Supercup (1): 2011–12

References

External links 
 

 Martin Fillo at fotbal.cz

1986 births
Living people
Czech footballers
Czech Republic youth international footballers
Czech Republic under-21 international footballers
Czech Republic international footballers
Czech expatriate footballers
Czech First League players
Viking FK players
FC Viktoria Plzeň players
FK Mladá Boleslav players
Brentford F.C. players
Association football forwards
Eliteserien players
English Football League players
Expatriate footballers in Norway
Czech expatriate sportspeople in Norway
People from Planá
Expatriate footballers in England
1. FK Příbram players
FK Teplice players
FC Baník Ostrava players
Association football wingers
Czech expatriate sportspeople in England
Czech National Football League players
FC Fastav Zlín players
Sportspeople from the Plzeň Region